Marian Hailey-Moss (born February 1, 1941) is an American actress, author, and humanitarian.

Biography
Born in Portland, Oregon, Hailey-Moss took a degree in drama at the University of Washington.  She began her acting career in the early 1960s with performances in Shakespearean festivals.  She moved to New York City a few years later where she was cast in a series of Broadway plays, avant-garde productions, and motion pictures.  She played the critically acclaimed role of Brenda in the 1970 film Lovers and Other Strangers.

Hailey-Moss was married to Sesame Street writer Jeff Moss from 1973 until 1985.

Partial filmography
 Jenny (1970) - Kay
 Lovers and Other Strangers (1970) - Brenda
 Harvey (1972) - Myrtle Mae Simmons
 The Seduction of Joe Tynan (1979) - Sheila Lerner
 The Survivors (1983) - Jack's Wife
 Random House Beginner Book Video (1989-1991) Narration and Additional Voices

Bibliography

References

External links

1941 births
Living people
American film actresses
American stage actresses
American television actresses
Actresses from Portland, Oregon
21st-century American women